Terpstra is a Dutch surname of Frisian origin, which is a topographic name for a person who lived on a terp, a prehistoric man-made mound built on low-lying land as a habitation site. The name may refer to:

Anne Terpstra (born 1991), Dutch Olympic cross-country cyclist
Erica Terpstra (born 1943), Dutch politician
John Terpstra, Canadian poet
Julius Terpstra (born 1989), Dutch politician
Mike Terpstra (born 1963), American basketball coach
Mike Terpstra (cyclist) (born 1987), Dutch cyclist
Niki Terpstra (born 1984), Dutch cyclist
Vern Terpstra (1927–2013), American business theorist

References

Dutch-language surnames
Surnames of Frisian origin
Toponymic surnames